The BMW M6 GTLM is an endurance grand tourer (GT) car constructed by the German automobile manufacturer BMW. The car was announced to be under development, through a press release in October 2015, following the announcement and unveiling of the BMW M6 GT3, although few of the car's technical specifications were revealed. The car was based on the BMW M6 GT3, and the car had its initial shakedown and testing conducted by BMW Team RLL, at the Sebring International Raceway, in Florida, during early November 2015. The car had its race debut at the 2016 24 Hours of Daytona with BMW Team RLL.

Development 
The BMW M6 GTLM was built and developed by BMW Motorsport in Germany, the new-generation GT contender marked a significant departure from its predecessor, the Z4 GTE, both in appearance and performance, with virtually zero carryover between the two cars. The car featured a significantly greater wheelbase, at 2910mm for the M6, compared to the 2512mm wheelbase of the Z4, increasing its stability. The car was a development of the BMW M6 GT3, with the key differences between the GT3 and GTLM versions of the car being the rear wing and brakes, as well as some electronics. The BMW M6 GTLM would be eligible for competition in only the IMSA WeatherTech SportsCar Championship.

Competition history

2016 season

Teams Championship

Manufacturer's Championship

2017 season

Manufacturer's Championship

References

External links 

M6 GTLM
Grand tourer racing cars
LM GTE cars